Elamaldeniya (එළමල්දෙණිය)  is a small village in Sri Lanka. It is located within Kandy District Central Province in udunuwara electorate in the electoral district of Kandy.

See also
List of towns in Central Province, Sri Lanka

External links

Populated places in Kandy District